Spilsby was a rural district in Lincolnshire, parts of Lindsey from 1894 to 1974.

It was created by the Local Government Act 1894 from the Spilsby rural sanitary district.  Due to growth in other areas, it was reduced three times: in 1896 when Alford was constituted an urban district; in 1925 when the civil parish of Sutton in the Marsh became part of Mablethorpe and Sutton Urban District; and in 1926, when the neighbouring Skegness Urban District was extended.  In 1936 a County Review Order enlarged the district when it absorbed the former Sibsey Rural District.

It survived until 1974. Under the Local Government Act 1972, it was merged with other districts to form the new East Lindsey district.

Civil parishes
The rural district contained the following civil parishes:
Addlethorpe
Alford until 1896, when it was constituted a separate urban district.
Anderby
Ashby by Partney
Aswardby
Bilsby
Bolingbroke
Bratoft
Brinkhill
Burgh le Marsh
Calceby
Carrington (from 1936)
Chapel St Leonards (from 1896: formed from part of Mumby CP)
Claxby
Croft
Cumberworth
Dalby
Driby
East Keal
East Kirkby
Eastville
Farlesthorpe
Frisby
Friskney
Frithville (from 1936)
Great Steeping
Gunby
Hagnaby
Halton
Holegate
Hareby
Harrington
Hogsthorpe
Hundleby
Huttoft
Ingoldmells
Irby in the Marsh
Langriville (from 1936)
Langton by Spilsby
Little Steeping
Markby
Mavis Enderby
Midville
Mumby
New Leake
Orby
Partney
Raithby
Rigsby with Ailsby
Sausthorpe
Scremby
Sibsey (from 1936)
Skendleby
South Ormsby cum Ketsby
Spilsby
Stickford
Stickney
Sutterby (until 1936: absorbed by Langton by Spilsby CP)
Sutton in the Marsh (until 1925: became part of Mablethorpe and Sutton Urban District)
Thornton le Veal (from 1936)
Thorpe St Peter
Toynton All Saints
Toynton St Peter
Ulceby with Fordington
Wainfleet All Saints
Wainfleet St Mary
Welton le Marsh
West Fen
West Keal
Westville (from 1936)
Willoughby with Sloothby
Winthorpe (until 1926: absorbed by Addlesthorpe CP and Skegness Urban District)

References
http://www.visionofbritain.org.uk/unit_page.jsp?u_id=10074538

Rural districts of Lindsey
Districts of England abolished by the Local Government Act 1972
Districts of England created by the Local Government Act 1894